Windeyer is a locality in the Mid-Western Regional Council of New South Wales, Australia.

Windeyer is a former goldmining town which has been described as "nearly a ghost town". At its peak during the gold rushes of the 1850s there were 29 hotels, 10 schools and numerous Chinese joss houses in the area, the town at that time spreading over several kilometres. It is now a small rural hamlet, containing a hotel (the Gold & Fleece Hotel), a community hall, an Anglican church, a cemetery and numerous old houses and former shops and public buildings.

Windeyer Public School opened in November 1859, closed in April 1861, reopened in January 1866, and closed in December 2014.

Richardson's Point Post Office opened at Windeyer on 1 August 1854. It was renamed Windeyer Post Office  1859. It closed on 30 August 1986.

Windeyer Police Station was established in 1855 and closed "by late 2007".

Heritage listings
Windeyer has a number of heritage-listed sites, including:
 Old Hargraves Road: Gold Mining Water Race

References

Localities in New South Wales
Mid-Western Regional Council